is the 42nd single by Zard, released on 10 May 2006 by the B-Gram Records label. This single is not included in any studio album, but was released on their compilation album, Golden Best: 15th Anniversary, in 2006.

The single reached #10 in the charts in its first week. It stayed in the charts for nine weeks and sold over 24,000 copies.

This was the last single released by Izumi Sakai before her death.

Track listing
All songs were written by Izumi Sakai and arranged by Takeshi Hayama

composer: Aika Ohno

composer: Izumi Sakai
 (piano instrumental version)
 (original karaoke)

References

2006 singles
Zard songs
Songs written by Izumi Sakai
2006 songs
Songs written by Aika Ohno